John Rogers SC (born 11 September 1947) is an Irish barrister who served as Attorney General of Ireland from 1984 to 1987.

He was educated at Rockwell College and Trinity College, Dublin.

The Labour Party demanded the right to choose the Attorney General in the coalition government of 1984. At the time Mary Robinson was expected to be chosen; instead the nomination went to John Rogers, who had not yet been appointed a senior counsel (SC). Traditionally a new Attorney General would have practised as a senior counsel for a number of years prior to his or her appointment. Rogers was appointed an SC on the day he was made Attorney General of Ireland. He has worked as a senior counsel in the Law Library, Dublin, from 1987 to date. Rogers was banned from driving, for 2 years, in 1998 after being arrested for drink driving. He was more than twice over the legal limit.

References 

1947 births
Living people
Irish Senior Counsel
Attorneys General of Ireland
People educated at Rockwell College